Curwensville Dam is located on the West Branch Susquehanna River about 0.6 miles (1 km) upstream from Curwensville in Clearfield County, Pennsylvania. The dam is an earth fill structure 2,850 feet long, rising 131 feet above the stream bed, with a spillway and gate-controlled outlet.

The project is owned and operated by the United States Army Corps of Engineers.  Clearfield County operates and maintains the recreation area which includes a beach, boat launch, picnic areas, athletic fields, playgrounds, picnic pavilions and a 43-site campground.

References
Wildernet.com http://www.wildernet.com/pages/area.cfm?areaID=PAAECW&CU_ID=1
http://clearfield-county.com/

West Branch Susquehanna River
Dams in Pennsylvania
United States Army Corps of Engineers dams
Dams completed in 1965
Buildings and structures in Clearfield County, Pennsylvania
Dams on the Susquehanna River